Sergei Nikitich Khrushchev (2 July 1935 – 18 June 2020) was a Russian engineer and the second son of the Cold War-era Soviet Premier Nikita Khrushchev with his wife Nina Petrovna Khrushcheva. He moved to the United States in 1991 and became a naturalized American citizen.

He was a jury member of the Rainer Hildebrandt international human rights award.

Career
Khrushchev held several advanced engineering degrees. From the Bauman Moscow State Technical University he earned his doctoral degree, and he earned a Ph.D. from the National Academy of Sciences of Ukraine. In addition, he earned an M.S. degree with distinction from the Moscow Power Engineering Institute. He also held an "occasional" professorship at the Naval War College in Newport, Rhode Island, meaning he was not a full-time professor (though he was for some time), but did teach there fairly often.

Prior to emigrating from the Soviet Union to the United States in 1991, Khrushchev worked in various high-level engineering positions. From 1968 to 1991, he served at the Control Computer Institute in Moscow, where he rose from section head to first deputy director in charge of research. From the years 1958 to 1968, Dr. Khrushchev worked as an engineer, then later as a deputy section head in charge of guidance systems for missile and space design. In this capacity, he worked on cruise missiles for submarine craft, military and research spacecraft, moon vehicles, and the Proton space booster.

He often spoke to American audiences to share his memories of the "other" side of the Cold War. He told Scientific American that he had tried to see the Apollo 11 moon landing through a telescope from Ukraine with a KGB officer. Khrushchev served as an advisor to The Cold War Museum. He was a Senior Fellow at the Watson Institute for International and Public Affairs at Brown University.

Personal life 
On 12 July 1999, Khrushchev and his wife, Valentina, became naturalized citizens of the United States. His son from a previous marriage, Nikita Sergeyevich Khrushchev, a Russian journalist, died on 22 February 2007, aged 47, from a stroke. He had another son, whose name is also Sergei (aka Khru)  who during his time at the Moscow State University (1991–1996) was considered the most intelligent student. Several pop-songs were dedicated to him by his fellow students and peers.

Death 
Khrushchev died on 18 June 2020, at his home in Cranston, Rhode Island, two weeks before his 85th birthday. His wife, Valentina Golenko, called the police to report an emergency, and he was pronounced dead at the scene. The cause of death, as certified by the Rhode Island medical examiner's office, was a gunshot wound to the head. The police said there were no signs of foul play, and the investigation by the police into his death was closed with no criminal charges filed.

Awards
Dr. Rainer Hildebrandt Medal endowed by Alexandra Hildebrandt
The Medal of the Labor Hero, the Order of Lenin, the Lenin Prize and the Prize of the Soviet Union's Council of Ministers.

Bibliography
Sergei Khrushchev, Khrushchev on Khrushchev – An Inside Account of the Man and His Era, by His Son, Sergei Khrushchev, edited and translated by William Taubman, Little, Brown, and Company, 1990, 
Sergei Khrushchev, Nikita Khrushchev and the Creation of a Superpower, Pennsylvania State University Press, 2000, hardcover: , softcover: 
Sergei Khrushchev, Memoirs of Nikita Khrushchev: Reformer, 1945–1964, Pennsylvania State University Press, 2006, hardcover: 
Sergei Khrushchev, Khrushchev in Power: Unfinished Reforms, 1961–1964. Lynne Rienner Publishers, 2014, hardcover:

References

External links

Professor Khrushchev's page and biographical sketch at Brown University's Watson Institute for International Studies -- Archived page via Wayback Machine -- 2 February 2011
Photographs from exhibit at the Brown University Library - Khrushchev and Khrushchev: from the Kremlin to Brown University: Sergei Khrushchev
Interview with Dr. Khrushchev in conjunction with the CNN series Cold War
Webcast from the National Public Radio of December 2001 appearance of Dr. Khrushchev at the National Press Club

Transcript of a October 1997 discussion on the Cuban Missile Crisis on the PBS program Newshour, in which Dr. Khrushchev was one of the speakers 
http://www.findarticles.com/p/articles/mi_qa3996/is_200110/ai_n8985890[ Review of Dr. Khrushchev's book Nikita Khrushchev and the Creation of a Superpower in the Fall 2001 issue of the journal Demokratizatsiya] 

1935 births
Engineers from Moscow
People from Providence, Rhode Island
Brown University faculty
Moscow Power Engineering Institute alumni
Naval War College faculty
Heroes of Socialist Labour
Lenin Prize winners
Recipients of the Order of Lenin
Soviet scientists
Soviet emigrants to the United States
Khrushchev family
Naturalized citizens of the United States
Suicides by firearm in Rhode Island
2020 suicides
Burials at Novodevichy Cemetery